Chaotic Resolve is the fourth album by Christian singer Plumb. It was released by Curb Records on February 28, 2006 and includes the single "Cut."

Track listing

Singles and promotion
"I Can't Do This" was the album's first single released to radio, followed by "Better." Both songs were later released as retail singles on the iTunes Store, each featuring a remix. "Real Life Fairytale" appeared on the soundtrack to the 2005 film The Perfect Man, and was released as a retail CD single in the United Kingdom in 2006.

"Cut" was the album's third retail single, released as a remix bundle for digital download. It peaked at #26 on Billboard'''s Hot Dance Airplay chart. Later, it appeared in a 2009 episode of The Vampire Diaries'' titled "The Tipping Point".

"Blush (Only You)" was the iTunes Store's free Single of the Week for April 4–10, 2006.

References

2006 albums
Plumb (singer) albums
Curb Records albums
Electronica albums by American artists
Heavy metal albums by American artists